Weeleus acutus is an antlion of the tribe Myrmeleontini, and the sole member of the genus Weeleus. It is endemic to New Zealand, and is widely distributed, being recorded from Kerikeri to Wakatipu. This species was first described by Francis Walker in 1853 from a specimen presented by Andrew Sinclair.

References

External links

Citizen science observations
The Ant-Lion: the "hideous", the "beautiful" (1932)

 Weeleus acutus discussed on RNZ Critter of the Week, 20 March 2020

Myrmeleontinae
Myrmeleontidae genera
Monotypic Neuroptera genera
Insects described in 1853
Insects of New Zealand
Endemic fauna of New Zealand
Endemic insects of New Zealand